The 2013–14 Umaglesi Liga was the 25th season of top-tier football in Georgia. The season began on 10 August 2013 and ended on 17 May 2014.

Teams

Stadiums and locations

First phase
The league began with a regular double-round robin schedule on 10 August 2013. The best six teams qualified for the championship round, which will determine the Georgian champions and the participants for the 2014–15 European competitions. The remaining six teams play in the relegation group, where the top four will secure places in the 2014–15 competition.

League table

Results

Second phase

Championship round

Table

Results

Relegation round

Table

Results

See also
 2013–14 Georgian Cup

External links
  

Erovnuli Liga seasons
1
Georgia